Mount Pollinger is a  summit in British Columbia, Canada.

Description
Mount Pollinger is located in the northern end of Yoho National Park, in the Waputik Mountains of the Canadian Rockies. Precipitation runoff from Pollinger drains west to the Amiskwi River, and east into Little Yoho River which in turn is a tributary of the Yoho River.

History

The first ascent of the mountain was made in 1901 by James Outram with guide Christian Kaufmann. 

Edward Whymper named this peak in 1901 for Joseph (Josef) Pollinger (1873–1943), an alpine guide from St. Niklaus, Switzerland, who visited Canada in 1901 with Whymper. During the short time he was in Canada, Pollinger made first ascents of Mont des Poilus, The President, The Vice President, Trolltinder Mountain, The Mitre, Mount Collie, Isolated Peak, Stanley Peak, Mount Whymper, Kiwetinok Peak, and Mount Marpole. The mountain's toponym was officially adopted on March 31, 1924, by the Geographical Names Board of Canada.

Geology

Mount Pollinger is composed of sedimentary rock laid down during the Precambrian to Jurassic periods. Formed in shallow seas, this sedimentary rock was pushed east and over the top of younger rock during the Laramide orogeny.

Climate

Based on the Köppen climate classification, Mount Pollinger is located in a subarctic climate zone with cold, snowy winters, and mild summers. Winter temperatures can drop below −20 °C with wind chill factors below −30 °C.

See also
Geography of British Columbia

Gallery

References

External links
 Josef Pollinger in memoriam: Americanalpineclub.org
 Mount Pollinger: Weather forecast
 Parks Canada web site: Yoho National Park

Two-thousanders of British Columbia
Canadian Rockies
Mountains of Yoho National Park
Kootenay Land District